Al-Mu'ayyad Shaykh (Circassian: Шеихъ ал-МуIэед) (1369 – 13 January 1421) was a Mamluk sultan of Egypt from 6 November 1412 to 13 January 1421.

Family
Shaykh's first wife was Khawand Khadija, whom he married before his accession to the throne. Another wife was Khawand Zaynab, the daughter of Sultan Barquq. She died in February–March 1423, and was buried in the mausoleum of her father. Another wife was Khawand Sa'adat. She was the daughter of Sirgitmish, and was the mother of his son Sultan Al-Muzaffar Ahmad. After Shaykh's death, she married Sultan Sayf ad-Din Tatar. She died in 1430. One of his concubines was Qutlubay, a Circassian. She was the mother of his son Sidi Ibrahim. After Shaykh's death she married Amir Inal al-Jakami. Ibrahim married Satita, daughter of Sultan An-Nasir Faraj. His only daughter was Khawand Asiya. She died in 1486.

Architecture

He has built the Mosque of Sultan al-Muayyad and Maristan of al-Mu'ayyad.

See also
Mosque of Sultan al-Muayyad

References

Burji sultans
15th-century Mamluk sultans
1369 births
1421 deaths